TV Shop is a teleshopping channel broadcasting 24 hours a day. It became famous in Europe by being one of the earliest free-to-air (FTA) channels on the Astra satellite. The service was initially set up by Modern Times Group but in 2007 was sold to American teleshopping giant Guthy Renker. Guthy Renker then sold the brand TVShop in 2016 to the current owner Stratos AG.

Television channels in Norway
Television stations in Denmark
Shopping networks
Television channels and stations established in 1989
Television channels in Sweden
Infomercials